Eugenio Alejandro Suárez (born July 18, 1991) is a Venezuelan professional baseball infielder for the Seattle Mariners of Major League Baseball (MLB). He previously played for the Detroit Tigers and Cincinnati Reds. Suárez was an All-Star in 2018.

Career

Detroit Tigers
Suárez originally signed with the Detroit Tigers as an amateur free agent on October 9, 2008. He played for the Venezuelan Summer League Tigers in 2009 and 2010. He played for the Gulf Coast Tigers of the Rookie-level Gulf Coast League and the Connecticut Tigers of the Class A-Short Season New York–Penn League in 2011 and the West Michigan Whitecaps of the Class A Midwest League in 2012. With the Whitecaps, he had a .288 batting average and 21 stolen bases in 135 games.

He started the 2013 season with the Lakeland Flying Tigers of the Class A-Advanced Florida State League and was promoted to the Erie SeaWolves of the Class AA Eastern League during the season. He was added to the Tigers' 40-man roster on November 20, 2013.

Suarez began the 2014 season with Erie, and was promoted to the Toledo Mud Hens of the Class AAA International League in May. Suárez was brought up to Detroit for the first time on June 4, and entered that night's game in the seventh inning. In his first at-bat, he reached base via a fielder's choice. On June 7, Suarez made his first major league start in a game against the Boston Red Sox, and recorded his first hit, a solo home run. He finished his rookie season with a .242 batting average, with 4 home runs and 23 RBIs in 85 games.

Cincinnati Reds
On December 11, 2014, the Tigers traded Suárez and minor league pitcher Jonathon Crawford to the Cincinnati Reds for starting pitcher Alfredo Simón. On June 11, 2015, he became the Reds' regular starting shortstop after Zack Cozart's season-ending injury. He finished the 2015 season with a .284 batting average, with 13 home runs and 48 RBIs. With the Todd Frazier trade to the Chicago White Sox, the Reds announced Suárez would be moved to third base full-time, with Zack Cozart returning to shortstop after his stint on the disabled list.

In 2016, Suárez hit 21 home runs and drove in 70 runs while hitting .248. On defense, he led the major leagues in errors, with 23.

In 2017, he hit 26 home runs and drove in 82 runs while batting .260.

On March 16, 2018, Suárez signed a seven-year $66 million contract with the Reds. Batting .315 with 19 home runs and 68 RBIs, he was named to the 2018 Major League Baseball All-Star Game. Suárez finished the season leading the team with 34 home runs and 104 RBIs.

In 2019, Suárez played 159 games, finishing with a .271 batting average, 49 home runs (2nd in the NL), 103 RBIs (10th), and struck out an MLB-leading 189 times. His 49 homers set new single season records for both NL third basemen and Venezuelan-born players. He led the National League in pull percentage (52.0%), and made contact with the lowest percentage of pitches he swung at outside the strike zone (44.2%) of all NL batters. In October 2019, Suárez was awarded the Luis Aparicio Award, which is given annually to a Venezuelan player in Major League Baseball (MLB) who is judged to have recorded the best individual performance in that year.

On January 28, 2020, it was revealed that Suárez underwent right shoulder surgery to remove loose cartilage, an injury that occurred during a swimming pool mishap at his residence in Pinecrest, Florida.

During the shortened 2020 season, Suárez hit .202/.312/.470 with 15 home runs and 38 RBIs in 57 games.

In 2021, Suárez's batting average fell dramatically, as he batted .169 through the first five months of the season. Despite a resurgence in September and October in which he batted .370, he finished the 2021 season with a .198 average. He also recorded 31 home runs and 79 RBIs.

Seattle Mariners
On March 14, 2022, the Reds traded Suárez and Jesse Winker to the Seattle Mariners in exchange for Justin Dunn, Jake Fraley, Brandon Williamson, and a player to be named later, later announced to be Connor Phillips. The transaction was a cost-cutting measure that saved the franchise just under $36 million but was unpopular with Reds fans. On July 8th, 2022, he hit his first career walk-off home run in a 5-2 extra-innings win over the Toronto Blue Jays. On September 7, 2022, he recorded his 1000th career hit with a 2-run home run off Chicago White Sox pitcher Michael Kopech. On September 11, 2022, Suárez homered twice in a 8-7 win over the Atlanta Braves, helping to atone for a blown 4-run lead in the top of the 9th by taking Kenley Jansen deep for a walk-off solo shot.

International career
On September 10, 2018, he was selected for the MLB All-Stars at the 2018 MLB Japan All-Star Series.

Personal life
Suarez and his wife, Génesis, have two daughters together and reside in Pincrest, Florida.

See also
 List of Major League Baseball players from Venezuela

References

External links

1991 births
Cincinnati Reds players
Connecticut Tigers players
Detroit Tigers players
Erie SeaWolves players
Gulf Coast Tigers players
Lakeland Flying Tigers players
Leones del Caracas players
Living people
Louisville Bats players
Luis Aparicio Award winners
Major League Baseball players from Venezuela
Major League Baseball shortstops
Major League Baseball third basemen
National League All-Stars
Seattle Mariners players
Toledo Mud Hens players
Venezuelan expatriate baseball players in the United States
Venezuelan Summer League Tigers players
West Michigan Whitecaps players
People from Ciudad Guayana
2023 World Baseball Classic players